Tregynrig is a hamlet in the community of Llanbadrig, Ynys Môn, Wales, which is 143.1 miles (230.2 km) from Cardiff and 222.8 miles (358.6 km) from London.

References

See also 
 List of localities in Wales by population

Villages in Anglesey
Hamlets in Wales